Inna Valerievna Ryskal ( born 15 June 1944 in Baku, Azerbaijan SSR) is a former Soviet volleyball player for the USSR. She was one of the pre-eminent players of the 1960s and the early 1970s, training at VSS Neftchi in Baku.

She was a major player to help Soviet Union women's national volleyball team to dominate the World in late 1960s to early 1970s by winning 1968 Mexico City Olympic Games, 1970 FIVB Women's World Championship, 1972 Munich Olympic Games and 1973 FIVB Women's World Cup in row . She achieved an Olympic silver medals in 1964 and 1976. She also won European Volleyball Championship in 1963, 1967 and 1971. In 1972 she was awarded the Order of the Red Banner of Labour.

References

External links
 

1944 births
Living people
Sportspeople from Baku
Azerbaijani people of Russian descent
Soviet women's volleyball players
Volleyball players at the 1964 Summer Olympics
Volleyball players at the 1968 Summer Olympics
Volleyball players at the 1972 Summer Olympics
Volleyball players at the 1976 Summer Olympics
Olympic volleyball players of the Soviet Union
Olympic gold medalists for the Soviet Union
Olympic silver medalists for the Soviet Union
Azerbaijani women's volleyball players
Olympic medalists in volleyball
Medalists at the 1976 Summer Olympics
Medalists at the 1972 Summer Olympics
Medalists at the 1968 Summer Olympics
Medalists at the 1964 Summer Olympics
Honoured Masters of Sport of the USSR
Recipients of the Shohrat Order